Robert Reiser is an American academic and professor of instructional systems at Florida State University.

Education and academic career 

Reiser graduated from Queens College of the City University of New York, where he read for a bachelor's in economics with minor in secondary education in June 1970. He received a Masters in school library media in 1974 and a doctorate in educational technology in 1975, both from Arizona State University.

His academic career began as a graduate assistant for the Department of Educational Technology and Library Science for Arizona State University in August 1972 for three years. In January 1976, he moved on to his current place of employment, Florida State University, where he became a research associate, Learning Systems Institute and assistant professor, Department of Educational Research.

He functioned as associate professor, Instructional Systems Program, Department of Educational Research for roughly five years. After which, he became department chair for Department of Educational Research from July 1987 - September 1996. Later, He spent approximately four years as the program leader of Instructional Systems Program for the Department of Educational Psychology and Learning Systems.

He later became professor of Instructional Systems Program for the Department of Educational Psychology and Learning Systems at Florida State University. Then, he held the position of Associate Dean for Research, College of Education at Florida State University from June 2010 to present.

Publications

Journal articles 

In 2009, Reiser and the Instructional Systems program at the Florida State University over the past two decades received high rankings as an organisation and for their publications. Reiser contributed the most publications to  Educational Technology Research and Development  and  held a ranking of third overall and fifth as an author.

Reiser's Research Gate profile lists 35 publications, which have been cited a total of 720 times.

Below is a selected list of Reiser's journal publications related to the field of instructional design and technology.

Gerlach, Vernon & Reiser, Robert & Brecke, Fritz. (1975). Algorithms in Learning, Teaching, and Instructional Design. 71.

Books 

Solis notes, Trends and Issues in Instructional Design and Technology 2nd Ed. was written to define instructional design and technology; the theories involved, job seeking competencies, resources  and an explanation of the current direction of  field. He  asserts  the presentation of instructional design models and the ‘‘systems’’ approach is less prescribed or linear in the book. He  recommends the book due to authors contribution and research to the field of instructional design and technology.

Harati recommends the book Trends and Issues in Instructional Design and Technology Third Ed. (2011) for individuals interested in the field of education, instructional design and technology. He notes the book outlines the issues and development of the future of instructional design and technology. He summarises the main idea of the  book as  illustrating how the learning process  is  improved by Instructional design (ID) by acquiring specific models and tasks. He asserts that ID seek to address the shortcomings of  traditional methods through data collection, chunking, scaffolding and authentic experiences during tasks.

Reiser, R.A., & Dempsey, J.V. (Eds.) (2002).Trends and Issues in Instructional Design and Technology. Upper Saddle River, New Jersey: Merrill/Prentice Hall.    
Reiser, R.A., & Dempsey, J.V. (Eds.) (2007).Trends and Issues in Instructional Design and Technology (2nd ed.). River, NJ: Pearson Education.    
Reiser, R.A., & Dempsey, J.V. (Eds.) (2012).Trends and Issues in Instructional Design and Technology (3rd ed.). Boston, MA: Pearson Education    
Reiser, R.A., & Dempsey, J.V. (Eds.) (2018). Trends and Issues in Instructional Design and Technology (4th ed.). New York, NY: Pearson Education.   
Reiser, R.A., & Dick, W. (1996). Instructional Planning: A Guide for Teachers (2nd ed.). Boston, Massachusetts: Allyn & Bacon.  
Reiser, R.A., & Gagne, R.M. (1983). Selecting Media for Instruction. Englewood Cliffs, New Jersey: Educational Technology

References

External links

Trends and Issues in Instructional Design and Technology——The Interview with Dr.Robert A.Reiser. (2008, February). Retrieved from http://en.cnki.com.cn/Article_en/CJFDTotal-JFJJ200802004.htm

Year of birth missing (living people)
Living people
Queens College, City University of New York alumni
Florida State University faculty
Arizona State University alumni